José Bonifácio is a municipality in the state of São Paulo, Brazil. The population is of 37,366 inhabitants and the area is 859.94 km2. The city belongs to the Microregion of São José do Rio Preto.

History

The history of José Bonifácio begins in 1906. The founder of the city, José Crescencio de Souza, built the first three houses. In 1910, the brothers Manuel, Justino e Carlos Rodrigues de Sant’Anna donated part of their land to the Catholic Church. The first chapel was built in 1913, and the town received the name of Cerradão.

In 1914, the town was elevated to district and on December 23, 1924, became a district of Mirassol, changing its name to the current form. 
José Bonifácio was officially established as a municipality on December 28, 1926.

Economy

The Tertiary sector is the economic basis of Bonifácio. Commerce, services and administration corresponds to 62.3% of the city GDP. Industry is 29.2% of the GDP, and the Primary sector corresponds to 8.5%.

Transportation

BR-153 - Rodovia Transbrasiliana
SP-425 - Rodovia Assis Chateaubriand

References

Municipalities in São Paulo (state)